The Journal of Archaeological Science is a monthly peer-reviewed academic journal that covers "the development and application of scientific techniques and methodologies to all areas of archaeology". The journal was established in 1974 by Academic Press and is currently published by Elsevier.

Abstracting and indexing
The journal is abstracted and indexed in:

According to the Journal Citation Reports, the journal has a 2018 impact factor of 3.030.

References

External links 

Publications established in 1974
English-language journals
Archaeology journals
Elsevier academic journals
Monthly journals